The Crimes of Stephen Hawke is a 1936 British historical melodrama film directed by George King and starring Tod Slaughter as the nefarious Stephen Hawke - who masquerades as the 'Spine-Breaker'. It also features Marjorie Taylor, D. J. Williams and Eric Portman. It was made at Shepperton Studios, with sets designed by Philip Bawcombe.

This is the third of Tod Slaughter's film outings, billed as a 'new-old melodrama'. In the introduction Slaughter appears in person, in a BBC studio, where he describes with relish his murderous activities in his two previous films: Maria Marten or Murder in the Red Barn (1935) and Sweeney Todd: The Demon Barber of Fleet Street (1936).

In the film Slaughter plays a seemingly kindly money-lender who dotes on his daughter Julia. He has however a double life as the notorious 'Spine-Breaker', Victorian England's most maniacal serial killer. His nefarious activities are eventually detected by his daughter's suitor Matthew Trimble, the son of one of his victims, who after pursuing and failing to catch him somewhat charitably opines to his daughter:

'Julia, Julia, my darling, listen to me. I know that he's the notorious 'Spine-Breaker' and he ought to be dead a hundred times but I also know that his death cannot bring my father back to life. But alive or dead it cannot alter my love for you.'

In the end Slaughter comes out of hiding to kill another unwelcome suitor of his daughter, before falling to his death from the roof of his house in a dramatic final exit.

Cast
 Tod Slaughter as Stephen Hawke 
 Marjorie Taylor as Julia Hawke 
 D.J. Williams as Joshua Trimble 
 Eric Portman as Matthew Trimble 
 Graham Soutten as Nathaniel 
 Gerald Barry as Miles Archer 
 George M. Slater as Lord Brickhaven 
 Charles Penrose as Sir Franklin 
 Norman Pierce as Landlord 
 Flotsam and Jetsam (Bentley Collingwood Hilliam and Malcolm McEachern) as Themselves  
 Cecil Bevan as Small Boys' Father 
 Annie Esmond as Small Boys' Nanny  
 Harry Terry as 1st Prisoner In Cell  
 Ben Williams as Prison Warder

External links
 

1936 films
British black-and-white films
British crime drama films
British historical films
1930s English-language films
Films directed by George King
1936 crime drama films
1930s historical films
Films shot at Shepperton Studios
Films set in the 19th century
Melodrama films
1930s British films